

Yearly high temperatures

Yearly low temperatures

References

Climate of Finland
Finland-related lists
Finland